The men's 81 kg competition of the 2015 World Judo Championships was held on 27 August 2015.

Results

Finals

Repechage

Pool A
First round fights

Pool B
First round fights

Pool C
First round fights

Pool D
First round fights

Prize money
The sums listed bring the total prizes awarded to 14,000$ for the individual event.

References

External links
 
 Draw

M81
World Judo Championships Men's Half Middleweight